Immanuel Lutheran School was founded in 1855 and is one of the oldest continually operating elementary schools in the state of Wisconsin.

In the 2013–2014 school year, Immanuel's Kindergarten class scored higher than 99% of schools in the nation on the Iowa Test of Basic Skills.

References

Elementary schools in Wisconsin
Lutheran schools in Wisconsin
1855 establishments in Wisconsin
Educational institutions established in 1855